Bagwanpur  is a village in Bhulath Tehsil in Kapurthala district of Punjab State, India. The village is administrated by a sarpanch who is an elected representative of the village.

Demography
According to the report published by Census India in 2011,Bagwanpur has 208 houses with the total population of 1,027 persons of which 566 are male and 461 females. Literacy rate of Bagwanpur is 81.19%, higher than the state average of 75.84%.  The population of children in the age group 0–6 years is 102 which is 9.93% of the total population.  Child sex ratio is approximately 672, lower than the state average of 846.

As per census 2011, 295 people were engaged in work activities out of the total population of Bagwanpur which includes 283 males and 12 females. According to census survey report 2011, 85.08% workers (Employment or Earning more than 6 Months) describe their work as main work and 14.92% workers are involved in Marginal activity providing livelihood for less than 6 months.

The village has schedule caste (SC) constitutes 12.85% of total population of the village and it doesn't have any Schedule Tribe (ST) population.

List of cities near the village 
Bhulath
Kapurthala
Phagwara
Sultanpur Lodhi

Air travel connectivity 
The closest International airport to the village is Sri Guru Ram Dass Jee International Airport.

References

External links
 Villages in Kapurthala
 List of Villages in Kapurthala Tehsil

Villages in Kapurthala district